The Bornholm Express is a fast passenger ferry which  was built in 2006 by Damen, Gorinchem, Netherlands. It is currently in active service.

Construction
Bornholm Express was built in Singapore in 2006 by Damen Group, Gorinchem, the Netherlands as yard number 082. The ship is a 322 GT monohull design constructed of aluminium. She is powered by three Caterpillar C32 diesel engines driving three screw propellers via reverse reduction gearboxes.

History
Bornholm Express was ordered by Christansøfarten Aps, Gudhjem on 28 May 2004. Launched in February 2006, she was completed in March 2006 and the loaded on board  for delivery. On 8 April 2006, she was unloaded in Copenhagen and then sailed to Gudhjem. She entered service on 1 June 2006. She uses the call sign OYGF, and is allocated the IMO number 9356476 and MMSI number 220451000. Her port of registry is Gudhjem.

Bornholm Express is licensed to carry 245 passengers. She serves  routes between Simrishamn, Sweden and Allinge, Bornholm, Denmark. It also serves Christiansø. It takes about 60 minutes to get to Allinge from Simrishamn and 40 minutes to Christiansø. In May and September, Bornholm Express runs between Bornholm and Kolobrzeg (Poland).

Update 3-Sep-2018: This vessel no longer sails between Sweden and Bornholm.

References

External links 
Bornholm Express

Water transport in Denmark
Water transport in Sweden
Water transport in Poland
2006 ships
Ships built in Singapore
Ferries of Denmark